Nunatsiaq News is a Canadian weekly newspaper in operation since 1973 based in Iqaluit, serving Nunavut and Nunavik, in Kativik, Nord-du-Québec. The paper is published every Friday by Nortext Publishing Corporation of Iqaluit and Ottawa, and bears a retail price of C$1. Co-op stores in Nunavut and Nunavik distribute it for free.

Most content is produced in English and Inuktitut, with some French content and the occasional article in Inuinnaqtun. Although circulation figures are not listed, the newspaper claims to have the largest circulation in Nunavut. The current managing editor is Corey Larocque.

See also 
 List of newspapers in Canada

References

External links 
 

1973 establishments in Canada
Bilingual newspapers
Mass media in Iqaluit
Multicultural and ethnic newspapers published in Canada
Newspapers published in Nunavut
Publications established in 1973
Weekly newspapers published in Canada